Kumaradeva was an Indian sculptor from the 8th century. His works include The Buddhist Goddess Shyama Tara (Green Tara) Attended by Sita Tara (White Tara) and Bhrikuti  He is also the author of the treatise Silparatna, which provides an account of fresco-secco painting techniques in detail. According to this text, a picture should be painted with appropriate colours along with proper forms and sentiments (rasas), and moods and actions (bhavas).

References

Indian male sculptors
8th-century Indian sculptors